KMOP (91.5 FM) is a non-commercial FM radio station owned by Marianas Educational Media Services, Inc. Licensed to Garapan, Saipan, it airs a religious format.

The station was assigned the KMOP call letters by the Federal Communications Commission on April 27, 2011.

References

External links
 
 

Radio stations established in 2010
MOP
Garapan
2010 in the Northern Mariana Islands
2010s establishments in the Northern Mariana Islands